Lee Si-jong (born 18 April 1947) is a South Korean public servant and politician. He is currently the governor of North Chungcheong Province.

References

External links
 Lee Si-jong's Facebook

1947 births
Living people
Minjoo Party of Korea politicians
People from North Chungcheong Province
Governors of North Chungcheong Province